In abstract algebra, the total quotient ring, or total ring of fractions, is a construction that generalizes the notion of the field of fractions of an integral domain to commutative rings R that may have zero divisors. The construction embeds R in a larger ring, giving every non-zero-divisor of R an inverse in the larger ring.  If the homomorphism from R to the new ring is to be injective, no further elements can be given an inverse.

Definition 

Hence we may localize the ring  at the set  to obtain the total quotient ring .

If  is a domain, then  and the total quotient ring is the same as the field of fractions. This justifies the notation , which is sometimes used for the field of fractions as well, since there is no ambiguity in the case of a domain.

Examples 

For a product ring , the total quotient ring  is the product of total quotient rings . In particular, if A and B are integral domains, it is the product of quotient fields.

For the ring of holomorphic functions on an open set D of complex numbers, the total quotient ring is the ring of meromorphic functions on D, even if D is not connected.

In an Artinian ring, all elements are units or zero divisors. Hence the set of non-zero divisors is the group of units of the ring, and so . But since all these elements already have inverses, . 

In a commutative von Neumann regular ring R, the same thing happens. Suppose a in R is not a zero divisor. Then in a von Neumann regular ring a = axa for some x in R, giving the equation a(xa − 1) = 0. Since a is not a zero divisor, xa = 1, showing a is a unit. Here again, .

In algebraic geometry one considers a sheaf of total quotient rings on a scheme, and this may be used to give the definition of a Cartier divisor.

The total ring of fractions of a reduced ring 

Proof: Every element of Q(A) is either a unit or a zerodivisor. Thus, any proper ideal I of Q(A) is contained in the set of zerodivisors of Q(A); that set equals the union of the minimal prime ideals  since Q(A) is reduced. Hence, the ideals  are maximal ideals of Q(A). Also, their intersection is zero. Thus, by the Chinese remainder theorem applied to Q(A), 
.
Let S be the multiplicatively closed set of non-zerodivisors of A.  By exactness of localization, 
,
which is already a field and so must be .

Generalization 

For example, if , then  is the trivial ring.

Citations

References

Commutative algebra
Ring theory

de:Lokalisierung_(Algebra)#Totalquotientenring